Santa Maria della Catena may refer to:
 Santa Maria della Catena, Aci Catena
 Santa Maria della Catena, Naples
 Santa Maria della Catena, Palermo